Sin Sophanat (born 20 April 1997) is a Cambodian footballer who plays for Visakha in the Cambodian League.

Club career
Sin Sophanat made his senior debut in Cambodia League on 16 March 2019 Vs Soltilo Angkor.

International career
Sin Sophanat made his debut in 2020 AFC U-23 Championship qualification against Australia national under-23 soccer team on 22 March 2019.

External links 
Sin Sophanat at NationalFootballTeams

Living people
1997 births
Cambodian footballers
Cambodia international footballers
Association football defenders
Sportspeople from Phnom Penh
Competitors at the 2019 Southeast Asian Games
Southeast Asian Games competitors for Cambodia
Visakha FC players
Cambodian Premier League players